Justice M. F. S. Pulle (1898 - 1975) was Ceylonese judge and lawyer. He was a Puisne Justice of the Supreme Court of Ceylon and the 17th Solicitor General of Ceylon. He was appointed on 1948, succeeding Hema Henry Basnayake, and held the office until 1950. He was succeeded by Robert Crossette-Thambiah.

References

Puisne Justices of the Supreme Court of Ceylon
Solicitors General of Sri Lanka
People from British Ceylon
Ceylonese advocates
1898 births
1975 deaths